Stefan Savić (Montenegrin Cyrillic: Стефан Савић, ; born 8 January 1991) is a Montenegrin professional footballer who plays for La Liga club Atlético Madrid and the Montenegro national team as a central defender.

Born in Mojkovac, Savić started his career at the local club Brskovo, before moving to BSK Borča, and then to Partizan. He won the double with Partizan, and then joined Manchester City for £6 million, winning the Premier League title in his only season there. In 2012, he was transferred to Fiorentina, making over 100 appearances across three seasons before signing with Atlético Madrid in 2015, where he won the UEFA Europa League and UEFA Super Cup in 2018.

A full international since 2010, Savić has made over fifty appearances and scored five goals for Montenegro.

Club career

Career in Serbia
Savić began his professional career with BSK Borča during the 2008–09 season. In early 2010, he was on a ten-day trial with Arsenal. According to Savić, he had agreed to join Arsenal in the summer, but the transfer never went through.

On 29 August 2010, it was announced that Savić had signed for Partizan on a four-year contract and was given the number 15 shirt. He made four appearances in the 2010–11 UEFA Champions League group stage and helped the club win the double.

Manchester City
On 6 July 2011, Savić signed a four-year contract for Manchester City in a £6 million deal. He made his debut against Swansea City on 15 August as a substitute at the City of Manchester Stadium. On 1 October, he came off the bench and scored his first goal for the club in a 4–0 victory away to Blackburn Rovers, heading in the conclusive goal from a corner from Samir Nasri.

Throughout centre-back Vincent Kompany's four-match ban from 11 to 25 January, Savić replaced him in the starting line-up, with third-choice Kolo Touré away on international duty with the Ivory Coast in the 2012 Africa Cup of Nations. Although Savić showed brief flashes of form in this time, he showed many instances of nervousness resulting in frequent misplaced passes, clearances and crucially conceded a penalty against Liverpool in a League Cup match, resulting in a Liverpool win. Via a poor first touch, he caused Jermain Defoe's goal in City's 3–2 win over Tottenham Hotspur. With Kompany's return to the starting team, Savić returned to the bench. He ended the season with 12 league appearances, enough for a medal, as Manchester City won the 2011–12 Premier League on the last day of the season.

Fiorentina
On 31 August 2012, Italian Serie A club Fiorentina signed Savić as part of a deal for Matija Nastasić to transfer the other way. He was given the number 15 shirt and made his Fiorentina debut on 7 October, playing the full 90 minutes in a 1–0 over Bologna, and in December he scored his first two goals in a 2–2 home draw with Sampdoria. He finished the season with 26 league appearances and one Coppa Italia appearance, helping Fiorentina to finish in fourth place in the 2012–13 Serie A, thereby securing a UEFA Europa League place for 2013–14.

Savić continued to be a mainstay in the Fiorentina defence in the 2013–14 season, making 31 appearances in the league as Fiorentina again finished in fourth place. Savić made four appearances in the Europa League proper and two more in qualifying as Fiorentina made the last 16 of the competition, being beaten 2–1 on aggregate by rivals Juventus. He also played both matches in the Coppa Italia semi-final win over Udinese and in the final, where his side lost 3–1 to Napoli.

In the 2014–15 season, Savić reached the milestone of 100 appearances for Fiorentina in all competitions. He was a major part of their run to the semi-finals in the 2014–15 Europa League and the third consecutive fourth-place finish in Serie A, making 41 appearances in all competitions.

Atlético Madrid
On 20 July 2015, Savić moved to Atlético Madrid for €10 million fee and signed a five-year contract with the club; midfielder Mario Suárez moving in the opposite direction for free as part of the deal, though Suárez later sold for €4 million in January 2016. Savić became the first Montenegrin footballer who played in the Champions League final in the 21st century, 18 years after Predrag Mijatović, who scored decisive goal in the 1998 final for Real Madrid against Juventus.

International career

Savić represented Montenegro at every youth level, including under-17, under-19 and under-21 teams. He made his international debut for the senior team in a friendly match against Northern Ireland on 11 August 2010, replacing Milan Jovanović for the final 15 minutes at the Stadion Pod Goricom. On 10 August 2011, he scored twice in a 3–2 friendly loss to neighbours Albania at the Loro Boriçi Stadium in Shkodër.

Personal life
Stefan's father Dragan was the president of the municipal assembly in Mojkovac when he committed suicide on 6 April 2011 when Stefan was 20 years old. Subsequently, Red Star Belgrade's Delije ultras, who are otherwise not known for being sympathetic to people associated with crosstown rivals Partizan, held up a banner which said "Support for Stefan Savić" after the loss of his father.

Career statistics

Club

International

International goals
As of match played 17 November 2022. Montenegro score listed first, score column indicates score after each Savić goal.

Honours
BSK Borča
Serbian First League: 2008–09

Partizan
Serbian SuperLiga: 2010–11
Serbian Cup: 2010–11

Manchester City
Premier League: 2011–12
FA Community Shield: 2012

Fiorentina
Coppa Italia runner-up: 2013–14

Atlético Madrid
La Liga: 2020–21
UEFA Europa League: 2017–18
UEFA Super Cup: 2018
UEFA Champions League runner-up: 2015–16

Individual
Serbian SuperLiga Team of the Season: 2010–11
Montenegrin Footballer of the Year (6): 2016, 2017, 2018, 2020, 2021, 2022

References

External links

Profile at the Atlético Madrid website

1991 births
Living people
People from Mojkovac
Association football central defenders
Montenegrin footballers
Montenegro youth international footballers
Montenegro under-21 international footballers
Montenegro international footballers
FK BSK Borča players
FK Partizan players
Manchester City F.C. players
ACF Fiorentina players
Atlético Madrid footballers
Serbian First League players
Serbian SuperLiga players
Premier League players
Serie A players
La Liga players
Montenegrin expatriate footballers
Expatriate footballers in Serbia
Expatriate footballers in England
Expatriate footballers in Italy
Expatriate footballers in Spain
Montenegrin expatriate sportspeople in Serbia
Montenegrin expatriate sportspeople in England
Montenegrin expatriate sportspeople in Italy
Montenegrin expatriate sportspeople in Spain